Little Elliot is a series of children's picture books, written and illustrated by Mike Curato and published by Henry Holt and Company. The series consists of five books: Little Elliot, Big City (2015); Little Elliot, Big Family (2015); Little Elliot, Big Fun (2016); Little Elliot, Fall Friends (2017); and Merry Christmas, Little Elliot (2018). The books follow the adventures of Elliot, a small, polka-dotted elephant.

Little Elliot, Big City (2015) 
Little Elliot, Big City was published August 26, 2014. It has since been translated into 12 languages (non-US English, Bulgarian, Catalan, French, German, Hebrew, Korean, Italian, Mandarin [simplified and traditional], Russian, and Spanish).

It received starred reviews from Publishers Weekly and Booklist, as well as positive reviews from School Library Journal, The Horn Book, and The New York Times. Kirkus provided a mixed review.

Little Elliot, Big Family (2015) 
Little Elliot, Big Family was published October 6, 2015. It has since been translated into nine languages (Bulgarian, Catalan, French, German, Mandarin [simplified and traditional], Russian, Spanish, and Japanese).

The received starred reviews from Kirkus and Publishers Weekly, as well as positive reviews from School Library Journal, Booklist, and Shelf Awareness.

Little Elliot, Big Fun (2016) 
Little Elliot, Big Fun was published August 30, 2016. It has since been translated into six languages (Catalan, French, Mandarin [simplified and traditional], Spanish, and Japanese).

The book received starred reviews from Publishers Weekly and Booklist, as well as positive reviews from Kirkus and School Library Journal.

Little Elliot, Fall Friends (2017) 
Little Elliot, Fall Friends was published August 29, 2017.

The book received a starred review from Publishers Weekly, as well as positive reviews from Kirkus, Booklist, and School Library Journal.

Merry Christmas, Little Elliot (2018) 
Merry Christmas, Little Elliot was published September 11, 2018.

The book received a starred review from Kirkus, as well as positive reviews from Publishers Weekly and Booklist.

Accolades

References 

Henry Holt and Company books
Book series introduced in 2015
American children's book series
American picture books
2015 children's books